The Philadelphia Museum of Art (PMoA) is an art museum originally chartered in 1876 for the Centennial Exposition in Philadelphia. The main museum building was completed in 1928 on Fairmount, a hill located at the northwest end of the Benjamin Franklin Parkway at Eakins Oval. The museum administers collections containing over 240,000 objects including major holdings of European, American and Asian origin. The various classes of artwork include sculpture, paintings, prints, drawings, photographs, armor, and decorative arts.

The Philadelphia Museum of Art administers several annexes including the Rodin Museum, also located on the Benjamin Franklin Parkway, and the Ruth and Raymond G. Perelman Building, which is located across the street just north of the main building. The Perelman Building, which opened in 2007, houses more than 150,000 prints, drawings and photographs, along with 30,000 costume and textile pieces, and over 1,000 modern and contemporary design objects including furniture, ceramics and glasswork. The museum also administers the historic colonial-era houses of Mount Pleasant and Cedar Grove, both located in Fairmount Park. The main museum building and its annexes are owned by the City of Philadelphia and administered by a registered nonprofit corporation.

Several special exhibitions are held in the museum every year, including touring exhibitions arranged with other museums in the United States and abroad. The museum had 437,348 visitors in 2021, making it the 65th most-visited art museum worldwide.

History

Early years (1877–1900)
Philadelphia celebrated the 100th anniversary of the Declaration of Independence with the Centennial Exposition in 1876. Memorial Hall, which contained the art gallery, was intended to outlast the Exposition and house a permanent museum. Following the example of London's South Kensington Museum, the new museum was to focus on applied art and science, and provide a school to train craftsmen in drawing, painting, modeling, and designing.

The Pennsylvania Museum and School of Industrial Art opened on May 10, 1877. (The school became independent of the museum in 1964 and is now part of the University of the Arts). The museum's collection began with objects from the Exposition and gifts from the public impressed with the Exposition's ideals of good design and craftsmanship. European and Japanese fine and decorative art objects and books for the museum's library were among the first donations. The location outside of Center City, Philadelphia, however, was fairly distant from many of the city's inhabitants. Admission was charged until 1881, then was dropped until 1962.

Starting in 1882, Clara Jessup Moore donated a remarkable collection of antique furniture, enamels, carved ivory, jewelry, metalwork, glass, ceramics, books, textiles and paintings. The Countess de Brazza's lace collection was acquired in 1894 forming the nucleus of the lace collection. In 1892 Anna H. Wilstach bequeathed a large painting collection, including many American paintings, and an endowment of half a million dollars for additional purchases. Works by James Abbott McNeill Whistler and George Inness were purchased within a few years and Henry Ossawa Tanner's The Annunciation was bought in 1899.

Construction of the main building (1895–1933)

The City Council of Philadelphia funded a competition in 1895 to design a new museum building, but it was not until 1907 that plans were first made to construct it on Fairmount, a rocky hill topped by the city's main reservoir. The Fairmount Parkway (renamed Benjamin Franklin Parkway), a grand boulevard that cut diagonally across the grid of city streets, was designed to terminate at the foot of the hill. But there were conflicting views about whether to erect a single museum building, or a number of buildings to house individual collections. The architectural firms of Horace Trumbauer and Zantzinger, Borie and Medary collaborated for more than a decade to resolve these issues. The final design is mostly credited to two architects in Trumbauer's firm: Howell Lewis Shay for the building's plan and massing, and Julian Abele for the detail work and perspective drawings. In 1902, Abele had become the first African-American student to be graduated from the University of Pennsylvania's Department of Architecture, which is presently known as Penn's School of Design. Abele adapted classical Greek temple columns for the design of the museum entrances, and was responsible for the colors of both the building stone and the figures added to one of the pediments.

Construction of the main building began in 1919, when Mayor Thomas B. Smith laid the cornerstone in a Masonic ceremony. Because of shortages caused by World War I and other delays, the new building was not completed until 1928. The building was constructed with dolomite quarried in Minnesota. The wings were intentionally built first, to help assure the continued funding for the completion of the design. Once the building's exterior was completed, twenty second-floor galleries containing English and American art opened to the public on March 26, 1928, though a large amount of interior work was incomplete.

The building's eight pediments were intended to be adorned with sculpture groups. The only pediment that has been completed, Western Civilization (1933) by C. Paul Jennewein, colored by Leon V. Solon, features polychrome sculptures of painted terra-cotta figures depicting Greek deities and mythological figures. The sculpture group was awarded the Medal of Honor of the Architectural League of New York.

The building is also adorned by a collection of bronze griffins, which were later adopted as the symbol of the museum in the 1970s.

Membership program and growth (1928–1976)

In the early 1900s, the museum started an education program for the general public, as well as a membership program. Fiske Kimball was the museum director during the rapid growth of the mid- to late-1920s, which included one million visitors in 1928—the new building's first year. The museum enlarged its print collection in 1928 with about 5,000 Old Master prints and drawings from the gift of Charles M. Lea, including French, German, Italian, and Netherlandish engravings. Major exhibitions of the 1930s included works by Eakins, Manet, Renoir, Cézanne, van Gogh, and Degas. In the 1940s, the museum's major gifts and acquisitions included the collections of John D. McIlhenny (Oriental carpets), George Grey Barnard (sculpture), and Alfred Stieglitz (photography).

Early modern art dominated the growth of the collections in the 1950s, with acquisitions of the Louise and Walter Arensberg and the A.E. Gallatin collections. The gift of Philadelphian Grace Kelly's wedding dress is perhaps the best known gift of the 1950s.

Extensive renovation of the building lasted from the 1960s through 1976. Major acquisitions included the Carroll S. Tyson, Jr. and Samuel S. White III and Vera White collections, 71 objects from designer Elsa Schiaparelli, and Marcel Duchamp's Étant donnés. In 1976 there were celebrations and special exhibitions for the centennial of the museum and the bicentennial of the nation. During the last three decades major acquisitions have included After the Bath by Edgar Degas and Fifty Days at Iliam by Cy Twombly.

Building expansion (2004–present) 

Due to high attendance and overflowing collections, the museum announced in October 2006 that Frank Gehry would design a building expansion. The  gallery will be built entirely underground behind the east entrance stairs and will not alter any of the museum's existing Greek revival facade. The construction was initially projected to last a decade and cost $500 million. It will increase the museum's available display space by sixty percent and house mostly contemporary sculpture, Asian art, and special exhibitions.

Uncertainty was cast on the plans by the 2008 death of Anne d'Harnoncourt, but new director Timothy Rub, who had initiated a $350 million expansion at the Cleveland Museum of Art, will be carrying out the plans as scheduled.  In 2010, Gehry attended the groundbreaking for the second phase of the expansion, due to be completed in 2012.  In that phase, a new art handling facility was created on the south side of the building, enabling the museum to reclaim a street level entrance, closed since the mid-1970s, which leads to a -long vaulted walkway that extends across the museum and is original to the 1928 building. The north entrance will be reopened to the public as a part of the "core project", which is scheduled for completion in 2020. The core project also focuses on the interior of the current building and will add  of public space, including  of new gallery space for American art and contemporary art.  In addition, a new space called the forum will be created, along with dining and retail spaces. Said Gehry: "When it's done, people coming to this museum will have an experience that's as big as Bilbao. It won't be apparent from the outside, but it will knock their socks off inside."

In March 2017, the museum announced a $525 million campaign. The core project is budgeted at $196 million and will be funded through the campaign. The museum also announced that more than 62 percent of the campaign goal has been met, as of March 30, 2017.

In March 2020, the museum was officially temporarily closed due to COVID-19 pandemic. All public events and programs were canceled until August 31, 2020. The museum reopened by late September 2020.

The most controversial part of the Gehry design remains a proposed window and amphitheater to be cut into the east entrance stairs. Others have criticized the design as too tame. The Gehry expansion is projected to be completed by 2028.

Collections

The Philadelphia Museum of Art houses more than 240,000 objects, highlighting the creative achievements of the Western world and those of Asia, in more than 200 galleries spanning 2,000 years. The museum's collections of Egyptian and Roman art, as well as many of its Pre-Columbian works, were relocated to the Penn Museum after an exchange agreement was made whereby the museum houses the university's collection of Chinese porcelain.

Highlights of the Asian collections include paintings and sculpture from China, Japan, and India; furniture and decorative arts, including major collections of Chinese, Japanese, and Korean ceramics; a large and distinguished group of Persian and Turkish carpets; and rare and authentic architectural assemblages such as a Chinese palace hall, a Japanese teahouse, and a 16th-century Indian temple hall.

The European collections, dating from the medieval era to the present, encompass Italian and Flemish early-Renaissance masterworks; strong representations of later European paintings, including French Impressionism and Post-Impressionism; sculpture, with a special concentration in the works of Auguste Rodin; decorative arts; tapestries; furniture; the second-largest collection of arms and armor in the United States; and period rooms and architectural settings ranging from the facade of a medieval church in Burgundy to a superbly decorated English drawing room by Robert Adam.

The museum's American collections, surveying more than three centuries of painting, sculpture, and decorative arts, are among the finest in the United States, with outstanding strengths in 18th- and 19th-century Philadelphia furniture and silver, Pennsylvania German art, rural Pennsylvania furniture and ceramics, and the paintings of Thomas Eakins. The museum houses the most important Eakins collection in the world.

Modern artwork includes works by Pablo Picasso, Jean Metzinger, Antonio Rotta, Albert Gleizes, Marcel Duchamp, Salvador Dalí and Constantin Brâncuși, as well as American modernists. The expanding collection of contemporary art includes major works by Agnes Martin, Cy Twombly, Jasper Johns, and Sol LeWitt, among many others.

The museum houses encyclopedic holdings of costume and textiles, as well as prints, drawings, and photographs that are displayed in rotation for reasons of preservation.

The Carl Otto Kretzschmar von Kienbusch Collection

The museum also houses the armor collection of Carl Otto Kretzschmar von Kienbusch. The Von Kienbusch collection was bequeathed by the celebrated collector to the museum in 1976, the Bicentennial Anniversary of the American Revolution. The Von Kienbusch holdings are comprehensive and include European and Southwest Asian arms and armor spanning several centuries.

On May 30, 2000, the museum and the State Art Collections in Dresden, Germany (Staatliche Kunstsammlungen Dresden), announced an agreement for the return of five pieces of armor stolen from Dresden during World War II. In 1953, Von Kienbusch had unsuspectingly purchased the armor, which was part of his 1976 bequest. Von Kienbusch published catalogs of his collection, which eventually led Dresden authorities to bring the matter up with the museum.

Special exhibitions
The Philadelphia Museum of Art organizes several special exhibitions each year. Special exhibitions have featured Salvador Dalí in 2005, Paul Cézanne in 2009, Auguste Renoir in 2010, Vincent van Gogh in 2012, Pablo Picasso in 2014, John James Audubon and Andy Warhol (et al.) in 2016, Winslow Homer and John Singer Sargent in 2017, and the Duchamp siblings—Marcel, Gaston, Raymond and Suzanne—in 2019. A Jasper Johns exhibition is planned for 2021.

In 2009, the museum organized Bruce Nauman: Topological Gardens, the official United States entry at the 53rd International Art Exhibition, more commonly known as the Venice Biennale, for which the artist Bruce Nauman was awarded the Golden Lion.

Administration

Directors

Below is the list of directors of the Philadelphia Museum of Art since its inception.

 Sasha Suda, 2022–Present
 Timothy Rub, 2009–2022
 Anne d'Harnoncourt, 1982–2008
 Jean Sutherland Boggs, 1978–1982
 Evan Hopkins Turner, 1964–1977
Arnold H. Jolles, 1977–1979 (acting)
Henri Gabriel Marceau, 1955–1964
 Fiske Kimball, 1925–1955
Sr. Samuel W. Woodhouse, 1923–1925 (acting)
 Langdon Warner, 1917–1923
 Edwin Atlee Barber, 1907–1916
 William Platt Pepper, 1899–1907
 Dalton Dorr, 1892–1899
William W. Justice, 1879–1880
William Platt Pepper, 1877–1879

Board of trustees

Below is the list of chairs of the board of trustees of the museum since 1991.

 Leslie A. Miller 2016–present
 Constance H. Williams 2010–2016
 Gerry Lenfest 2001–2009
 Raymond Perlman 1991–2001

Gallery

In popular culture
Besides being known for its architecture and collections, the Philadelphia Museum of Art has in recent decades become known due to the role it played in the Rocky filmsRocky (1976) and seven of its eight sequels, II, III, V, Rocky Balboa, Creed, Creed II, and Creed III. Visitors to the museum are often seen mimicking Rocky Balboa's (portrayed by Sylvester Stallone) famous run up the east entrance stairs, informally nicknamed the Rocky Steps. Screen Junkies named the museum's stairs the second most famous movie location behind only Grand Central Station in New York.

After filming was complete, Stallone donated the statue to the city of Philadelphia. The Philadelphia Art Commission eventually decided to relocate the statue to the now-defunct Spectrum sports arena due to controversy over its prominent placement at the top of the museum's front stairs and questions about its artistic merit. The statue was placed briefly on top of the stairs again for the 1990 film Rocky V and then returned to the Spectrum. In 2006, the statue was relocated to a new display area on the north side of the base of the stairs.

The museum provides the backdrop for concerts and parades because of its location at the end of the Ben Franklin Parkway. The museum's east entrance area played host to the American venue of the international Live 8 concert held on July 2, 2005, with musical artists including Dave Matthews Band, Linkin Park and Maroon 5. The Philadelphia Freedom Concert, orchestrated and headlined by Elton John, was held two days later on the same outdoor stage from the Live 8 concert while a preceding ball was held inside the museum.

On September 26, 2015, the Festival of Families event, attended by Pope Francis, was held along the Ben Franklin Parkway with musical performances by various acts within Eakins Oval in front of the museum, as well as in Logan Square.

On April 27, 2017, the 2017 NFL Draft was held at the museum through April 29 of that year.

On February 8, 2018, the victory parade for the Philadelphia Eagles' win in Super Bowl LII finished upon the museum steps, where players and team personnel gave speeches from a lectern to the large crowd gathered along Ben Franklin Parkway.

See also

 3rd Sculpture International
70 Sculptors, photograph by Herbert Gehr
 Barnes Foundation
 Pennsylvania Academy of the Fine Arts
 Woodmere Art Museum

References

External links
 
 Listing at Philadelphia Architects and Buildings, including more than 800 images, mostly of the main building's construction
Philadelphia Museum of Art within Google Arts & Culture

 
1876 establishments in Pennsylvania
Art museums established in 1876
Museums of American art
Philadelphia Register of Historic Places
Terminating vistas in the United States
Asian art museums in the United States
Art museums and galleries in Philadelphia
East Fairmount Park
Fairmount, Philadelphia
Horace Trumbauer buildings